The United Trade Unions of Serbia "Sloga" (USS Sloga) is a trade union and a left-wing political organization in Serbia. It was founded in 2008, and has been headed by Željko Veselinović since its foundation.

History 
United Trade Unions of Serbia "Sloga" was formed in 2008 by Željko Veselinović. It had regularly organized International Workers' Day walks. USS Sloga later organized media campaigns regarding workers' conditions, and had also criticized the economic model that has been pursued by Aleksandar Vučić. It participated as a political organization in the 2014 parliamentary election as part of the Democratic Party (DS) coalition list. Veselinović became a member of the National Assembly afterwards. 

According to USS Sloga, they had 100,000 members in 2017. Its members were threatened by the president of the Municipality of Ub Darko Glišić in 2018. USS Sloga regained its seat in the National Assembly following the 2022 general election.

Ideology 
It has been described as a left-wing trade union. USS Sloga defines itself as "an independent democratic trade union organization of employees that they join for the purpose of representation and protection of their professional, labor, economic, social, cultural and other individual and collective interests". Veselinović is a member of Trade Union Network of the Party of the European Left and European Social Forum. USS Sloga is a member of the World Federation of Trade Unions. USS Sloga opposes neoliberalism. It supports changing the Labor Law.

USS Sloga had also criticized the approach of other trade unions in Serbia. In 2017, they had argued that increasing the minimal wage for 15% would not be enough to cover the costs of a minimum consumer basket. In August 2022, they had proposed an increase in the minimum wage, wages, and pensions.

The trade union was a part of several opposition coalitions, including the Alliance for Serbia, United Opposition of Serbia, and United for the Victory of Serbia.

Electoral performance

Parliamentary elections

References 

Trade unions in Serbia
Political parties established in 2008
2008 establishments in Serbia
Left-wing parties in Serbia
Syndicalist political parties